10 (ten) is the even natural number following 9 and preceding 11. Ten is the base of the decimal numeral system, by far the most common system of denoting numbers in both spoken and written language. It is the first double-digit number. The reason for the choice of ten is assumed to be that humans have ten fingers (digits).

Anthropology

Usage and terms 
 A collection of ten items (most often ten years) is called a decade.
 The ordinal adjective is decimal; the distributive adjective is denary.
 Increasing a quantity by one order of magnitude is most widely understood to mean multiplying the quantity by ten.
 To reduce something by one tenth is to decimate. (In ancient Rome, the killing of one in ten soldiers in a cohort was the punishment for cowardice or mutiny; or, one-tenth of the able-bodied men in a village as a form of retribution, thus causing a labor shortage and threat of starvation in agrarian societies.)

Other

 The number of kingdoms in Five Dynasties and Ten Kingdoms period.
 The house number of 10 Downing Street.
 The number of Provinces in Canada.
 Number of dots in a tetractys.
 The number of the French department Aube.
 The number in tarot decks that corresponds to either Chance, Fortune, or the Wheel of Fortune, depending on the deck variant.

In mathematics
Ten is the fifth composite number. Ten is the smallest noncototient, a number that cannot be expressed as the difference between any integer and the total number of coprimes below it. It is the second discrete semiprime and the second member of the  discrete semiprime family. Ten has an aliquot sum σ(10) of 8 and is accordingly the first discrete semiprime to be in deficit, with all subsequent discrete semiprimes in deficit. Ten is the smallest number that can be written as the sum of two prime numbers in two different ways, and the only number whose sum and difference of its prime divisors yield prime numbers ( and ). It is also the smallest semiprime that is the sum of all the distinct prime numbers from its lower factor through its higher factor. In general, powers of 10 contain  divisors, where  is the number of digits: 10 has 22 = 4 divisors, 100 has 32 = 9 divisors, 1,000 has 42 = 16 divisors, 10,000 has 52 = 25 divisors, and so forth. Ten is the eighth Perrin number, preceded in the sequence by (5, 5, 7).

According to conjecture, ten is the average sum of the proper divisors of the natural numbers  if the size of the numbers approaches infinity. 

As important sums,
, the sum of the first three prime numbers.
, the sum of the first four positive integers.
, the sum of the first four factorials.
, the sum of the squares of the first two odd numbers.

The factorial of ten is equal to the product of the factorials of the first three odd primes, . Ten is also the first number whose fourth power can be written as a sum of two squares in two different ways ( and ).

In the sequence of triangular numbers, indexed powers of 10 in this sequence generate the following sequence of triangular numbers in decimal: 55 (10th), 5,050 (100th), 500,500 (1,000th), ... 

While 55 is the tenth triangular number, it is also the tenth Fibonacci number, and the largest such number to also be a triangular number. 

Ten is the first non-trivial decagonal number, the third centered triangular number and tetrahedral number, and the fifth semi-meandric number.

A  magic square has a magic constant of 505.

The aliquot sequence for 10 comprises five members (10, 8, 7, 1, 0) with this number being the second composite member of the 7-aliquot tree.

10 is the fourth telephone number, and the number of Young tableaux with four cells.

Ten is the smallest number whose status as a possible friendly number is unknown.

There are ten small Pisot numbers that do not exceed the golden ratio.

In geometry

A polygon with ten sides is called a decagon. As a constructible polygon with a compass and straight-edge, it has an internal angle of  degrees and a central angle of  degrees. All regular -sided polygons with up to ten sides are able to tile a plane-vertex alongside other regular polygons alone; the first regular polygon unable to do so is the eleven-sided hendecagon.  A decagon can fill a plane-vertex alongside two regular pentagons, and alongside a fifteen-sided pentadecagon and triangle. Ten of the eleven regular and semiregular (or Archimedean) tilings  of the plane are Wythoffian, the elongated triangular tiling is the only exception.

The regular decagon is the Petrie polygon of the regular dodecahedron and icosahedron, and it is the largest face that an Archimedean solid can contain, as with the truncated dodecahedron and the truncated icosidodecahedron. The decagon is the hemi-face of the icosidodecahedron, such that a plane dissection yields two mirrored pentagonal rotundae. A regular ten-pointed } decagram is the hemi-face of the great icosidodecahedron, as well as the Petrie polygon of two regular Kepler–Poinsot polyhedra. Ten non-prismatic uniform polyhedra contain regular decagons as faces (U26, U28, U33, U37, U39, ...), and ten contain regular decagrams as faces (U42, U45, U58, U59, U63...). The decagonal prism is also the largest prism that is a facet inside four-dimensional uniform polychora. 

There are ten regular star polychora in the fourth dimension. All of these polychora have orthographic projections in the  Coxeter plane that contain various decagrammic symmetries, which include the regular } form as well as its three alternate compound forms. 

 is a multiply transitive permutation group on 10 points. It is an almost simple group, of order 720 = 24·32·5 = 2·3·4·5·6 = 8·9·10. It functions as a point stabilizer of degree 11 inside the smallest sporadic group , a Mathieu group which has an irreducible faithful complex representation in 10 dimensions. 

 is an infinite-dimensional Kac–Moody algebra which has the even Lorentzian unimodular lattice II9,1 of dimension 10 as its root lattice. It is the first  Lie algebra with a negative Cartan matrix determinant, of −1.

There are precisely ten affine Coxeter groups that admit a formal description of reflections across  dimensions in Euclidean space. These contain infinite facets whose quotient group of their normal abelian subgroups is finite. Regarding Coxeter groups in hyperbolic space, there are infinitely many such groups; however, ten is the highest rank for paracompact hyperbolic solutions, with a representation in nine dimensions. There also exist hyperbolic Lorentzian cocompact groups where removing any permutation of two nodes in its Coxeter–Dynkin diagram leaves a finite or Euclidean graph. The tenth dimension is the highest dimensional representation for such solutions, which share a root symmetry in eleven dimensions. These are of particular interest in M-theory of string theory.

List of basic calculations

In science
The SI prefix for 10 is "deca-".

The meaning "10" is part of the following terms:
 decapoda, an order of crustaceans with ten feet. 
 decane, a hydrocarbon with 10 carbon atoms. 

Also, the number 10 plays a role in the following: 
 The atomic number of neon.
 The number of hydrogen atoms in butane, a hydrocarbon.
 The number of spacetime dimensions in some superstring theories.

The metric system is based on the number 10, so converting units is done by adding or removing zeros (e.g. 1 centimeter = 10 millimeters, 1 decimeter = 10 centimeters, 1 meter = 100 centimeters, 1 dekameter = 10 meters, 1 kilometer = 1,000 meters).

Astronomy

 The New General Catalogue object NGC 10, a magnitude 12.5 spiral galaxy in the constellation Sculptor.
 Messier object M10, a magnitude 6.4 globular cluster in the constellation Ophiuchus.

In religion and philosophy

 References in the Bible, Judaism and Christianity:
 The Ten Commandments of Exodus and Deuteronomy are considered a cornerstone of Judaism and Christianity.
 People traditionally tithed one-tenth of their produce. The practice of tithing is still common in Christian churches today, though it is disputed in some circles as to whether or not it is required of Christians.
 In Deuteronomy 26:12, the Torah commands Jews to give one-tenth of their produce to the poor (Maaser Ani). From this verse and from an earlier verse (Deut. 14:22) there derives a practice for Jews to give one-tenth of all earnings to the poor.
 Jews observe the annual Ten Days of Repentance beginning on Rosh Hashanah and ending on Yom Kippur.
 In Jewish liturgy, Ten Martyrs are singled out as a group.
 There are said to be Ten Lost Tribes of Israel (those other than Judah and Benjamin).
 There are Ten Sephirot in the Kabbalistic Tree of Life.
 In Judaism, ten men are the required quorum, called a minyan, for prayer services.
 In Genesis 28:23-32, Abraham pleads on behalf of Sodom and Gomorrah, asking to save the cities if there are enough righteous people there. He starts at 10 per city, and ends with 10 total in all cities.
 Interpretations of Genesis in Talmudic and Midrashic teachings suggest that on the first day, God drew forth ten primal elements from the abyss in order to construct all of Creation: Heaven (or Fire), Earth, Chaos, Void, Light, Darkness, Wind (or Spirit), Water, Day, and Night. See also Bereshit (parsha).
 In Pythagoreanism, the number 10 played an important role and was symbolized by the tetractys.
 In Hinduism, Lord Vishnu appeared on the earth in 10 incarnations, popularly known as Dashaavathar.
 In Sikhism, there are ten human Gurus.

In money
Most countries issue coins and bills with a denomination of 10 (See e.g. 10 dollar note). Of these, the U.S. dime, with the value of ten cents, or one tenth of a dollar, derives its name from the meaning "one-tenth" − see Dime (United States coin)#Denomination history and etymology.

In music

 The interval of a major tenth is an octave plus a major third.
 The interval of a minor tenth is an octave plus a minor third.
 "Ten lords a-leaping" is the gift on the tenth day of Christmas in the carol "The Twelve Days of Christmas".

In sports and games
 Decathlon is a combined event in athletics consisting of ten track and field events.
 In association football, the number 10 is traditionally worn by the team's advanced playmaker. This use has led to "Number 10" becoming a synonym for the player in that particular role, even if they do not wear that number.
 In gridiron football, a team has a limited number of downs to advance the ball ten yards or more from where it was on its last first down; doing this is referred to as gaining another first down.
 In auto racing, driving a car at ten-tenths is driving as fast as possible, on the limit.
 In a regular basketball game, two teams playing against each other have 5 members each, for a total of 10 players on court. Under FIBA, WNBA, and NCAA women's rules, each quarter runs for 10 minutes. 
 In blackjack, the Ten, Jack, Queen and King are all worth 10 points.
 In boxing, if the referee counts to 10 whether the boxer is unconscious or not, it will declare a winner by knockout.
 In men's field lacrosse, each team has 10 players on the field at any given time, except in penalty situations.
 Ten-ball is a pool game played with a cue ball and ten numbered balls.
 In most rugby league competitions, the number 10 is worn by one of the two starting props. One exception to this rule is the Super League, which uses static squad numbering.
 In rugby union, the starting fly-half wears the 10 shirt.
 In ten-pin bowling, 10 pins are arranged in a triangular pattern and there are 10 frames per game.

In technology
 Ten-codes are commonly used on emergency service radio systems.
 Ten refers to the "meter band" on the radio spectrum between 28 and 29.7 MHz, used by amateur radio.
 ASCII and Unicode code point for line feed.
 In MIDI, Channel 10 is reserved for unpitched percussion instruments.
 In the Rich Text Format specification, all language codes for regional variants of the Spanish language are congruent to 10 mod 256.
 In macOS, the F10 function key tiles all the windows of the current application and grays the windows of other applications.

Age 10
This is generally the age when a child enters the preteen stage and also a denarian (someone within the age range of 10–19).
The ESRB recommends video games with an E10+ rating to children aged 10 and up.

In other fields

 Blake Edwards' 1979 movie 10.
 Series on HBO entitled 1st & Ten which aired between December 1984 and January 1991.
 Series on ESPN and ESPN2 entitled 1st and 10 which launched on ESPN in October 2003 to 2008 and moved to ESPN2 since 2008.
 In astrology, Capricorn is the 10th astrological sign of the Zodiac.
 In Chinese astrology, the 10 Heavenly Stems, refer to a cyclic number system that is used also for time reckoning.
 A 1977 short documentary film Powers of Ten depicts the relative scale of the Universe in factors of ten (orders of magnitude).
 CBS has a game show called Power of 10, where the player's prize goes up and down by either the previous or next power of ten.
 "Ten Chances" is one of the pricing games on The Price is Right.
 There are ten official inkblots in the Rorschach inkblot test.
 The traditional Snellen chart uses 10 different letters.
 Ten is an Australian television network. The Sydney member of the network has the three-letter call-sign TEN and used to broadcast in analogue on VHF Channel 10.
 Number Ten (also called Ella) is a character in the book series Lorien Legacies. The sixth book, The Fate of Ten, is named after her.
 A Cartoon Network franchise Ben 10, which has a number on its title.

See also

List of highways numbered 10

References

External links

Integers